Shamsheer Vayalil Parambath (born 11 January 1977) is an Indian radiologist and businessman. He is the founder, chairman and managing director of VPS Healthcare Group, and the vice chairman and managing director of Amanat Holdings, a healthcare and education investment company. , Vayalil has a net worth of US$1.4 billion.

Early life
Vayalil was born on 11 January 1977 in Kozhikode, Kerala, India. His parents are Hashim Pokkinari and Mariyam Barakkool.

After his schooling, he pursued a MBBS at Kasturba Medical College, Manipal, then obtained his MD in radiology from Sri Ramachandra Medical College and Research Institute, Chennai. He did his radiology fellowship at Massachusetts General Hospital, Boston.

Career
Vayalil was a radiologist for 12 months at Sheikh Khalifa Medical City, Abu Dhabi, UAE. In 2007, he opened his first hospital LLH Hospital in Abu Dhabi. Over the next twelve years, his company VPS Healthcare started 23 hospitals in four countries with over 125 medical centres and about 13,000 employees in the Middle East, Europe, and India.

Vayalil is a member of the UAE Medical Council, a board member of the Abu Dhabi University, and a member of the advisory committee of the University of Sharjah College of Medicine. He is a former director of Kannur International Airport Ltd, and a member of the Kerala NRI Commission, a commission with quasi-judicial powers set up in Kerala to protect the rights, interests, and properties of non-resident Indians (NRIs) from Kerala.

Philanthropy
Vayalil is a member of "The Giving Pledge". He pledged to donate half his wealth for philanthropy.

VPS Healthcare donated emergency healthcare equipment worth Rs 1.75 crores when Nipah viral infection was diagnosed in Kerala in 2018.

Vayalil personally pledged to donate Dh 26 million (Rs 50 crore) to Kerala after the monsoon floods in August 2018.

He was honoured at an event hosted by United Nations in New York for his philanthropy. He was recognised for the community welfare initiatives, which include the '1000 Free Heart Surgeries' initiative for the underprivileged, launched as a tribute to Mohammed bin Zayed Al Nahyan. As part of the initiative, people from around the world, from babies to a 70-year-old, have undergone cardiac surgeries.

Vayalil made donations to the UAE Red Crescent for Syrian refugees and to the Indian Prime Minister's National Relief Fund for flood-hit Jammu and Kashmir. He extended his support to the kin of the victims of the Mangaluru plane crash in May 2010. He offered jobs and educational assistance to the families of the victims and many of the people that took up jobs at VPS Healthcare continue to work with the company today.

Non-resident Indian voting rights

In April 2014, Vayalil filed a petition in the Supreme Court of India in connection with non-resident Indian (NRI) voting rights. Currently, voters have to travel to their constituency to vote. The Court directed the Election Commission of India to explore the possibility for NRIs to cast their vote from their place of residence. In October 2014, the Commission submitted its report to the Court, recommending that NRIs be permitted to vote by proxy and e-postal ballot. On 9 August 2018, the Representation of the People (Amendment) Bill 2017, enabling the facility of proxy voting to overseas Indians, was passed by the Lok Sabha, and was awaiting introduction in the upper house of the Indian Parliament, the Rajya Sabha.

Awards and accolades
 2014 – Pravasi Bharatiya Samman for his role in developing a healthcare business in the United Arab Emirates and for promoting UAE-India ties
 2014 – Received an honorary Doctorate (D.Litt & DSE Honors Degree) from Aligarh Muslim University

Personal life
Vayalil is married to Shabeena, the eldest daughter of fellow billionaire M. A. Yusuff Ali. They have four children and live in the UAE.

References

External links
 

1977 births
Living people
Indian radiologists
Businesspeople of Indian descent
Indian philanthropists
People from Abu Dhabi
Giving Pledgers
21st-century philanthropists
Recipients of Pravasi Bharatiya Samman
Indian chief executives
Indian company founders
Indian billionaires
Indian expatriates in the United Arab Emirates